Indravarman II was the ruler of the Khmer Empire, son of Jayavarman VII. There is some dispute regarding the actual period of his reign, even because his successor, Jayavarman VIII, probably destroyed historical records about him, but the only inscription which directly mention him reports that he died in 1243. He was a Buddhist and was also credited with having enlarged (or completed) some of Jayavarman VII's temple. During his peaceful kingdom, the Khmers lost control of Champa and the newborn Sukhothai Kingdom under Indraditya took possession of some western territories. 

David P. Chandler hypothesized that Indravarman II was possibly the Leper King of Khmer legends.

References

David P. Chandler: A History of Cambodia. Westview Press 2007. .
Marston, John. Guthrie, Elizabeth. History, Buddhism, and New Religious Movements in Cambodia. University of Hawai'i Press. .

External links
Ta Som Temple on World Monuments Fund's site

13th-century Cambodian monarchs
Cambodian Buddhist monarchs
Khmer Empire
1243 deaths
Year of birth unknown